was a classified advertising website founded in 2004 by the alternative newspaper chain New Times Inc./New Times Media (later known as Village Voice Media or VVM) as a rival to Craigslist.

Similar to Craigslist, Backpage let users post ads to categories such as personals, automotive, rentals, jobs and adult services. It soon became the second largest online classified site in the United States.

Craigslist closed its "Adult Services" section in 2010 in response to pressure from state attorneys general and other critics claiming the section facilitated prostitution. Much of Craigslist's share of the adult ad market migrated to other sites, with Backpage being the main beneficiary.

Craigslist's former critics focused on Backpage, which resisted moves to censor the site until January 2017; Backpage closed their adult section prior to a Congressional hearing.

On April 6, 2018, the U.S. Department of Justice announced the seizure and takedown of Backpage, part of a 93-count indictment of seven former owners and executives, charging them with facilitating prostitution under the U.S. Travel Act, as well as money laundering and conspiracy.

In July 2018, a superseding indictment increased the number of counts to 100. In August 2018, one defendant accepted a plea deal. The remaining six defendants pled not guilty to all charges, and a trial by jurors began on September 1, 2021.

On September 14, 2021, federal Judge Susan Brnovich declared a mistrial in the case, saying the prosecution and their witnesses made excessive references to child sex trafficking in a case where the defendants are not charged with that crime. This "is something I can't overlook and will not overlook," she said, setting a status hearing for October 5. At that hearing, Brnovich scheduled a new trial for Feb. 22, 2022.

Brnovich recused herself for unknown reasons on October 29, 2021, and federal Judge Diane Humetewa was chosen by lot to replace her. (Humetewa is the fourth judge to be assigned the case so far.) Reason magazine reports that a new trial has been delayed as the defense appeals Humetewa's denial of a motion to dismiss the case for good.

On Sept. 21, 2022 a three-judge panel of the Ninth Circuit Court of Appeals denied the defendants' request that the court reverse Humetewa and dismiss the case because a new trial would violate the U.S. Constitution's prohibition on Double Jeopardy. The panel wrote that "the government’s misconduct" during the trial "was not so egregious as to compel a finding" that prosecutors intended to provoke a mistrial, the legal standard for dismissal in this instance. A new trial reportedly could take place in 2023.

As of April 6, 2018 the website states that Backpage and its affiliates has been seized by the FBI and a handful of other government agencies are listed as participating in and supporting the enforcement action.

History

Craigslist and Backpage 
Craigslist's founder, Craig Newmark, started Craigslist as a free e-mail distribution list in 1995, featuring events and other listings in the San Francisco area. Newmark registered "craigslist.org," taking the site live in 1996. In 2000, the company expanded outside of San Francisco, and by 2009, it served over 700 cities in 70 countries.

Non-commercial users post free ads in most categories on Craigslist. 2006, then-San Francisco Bay Guardian executive editor Tim Redmond wrote Craigslist "pretty-much wiped-out traditional daily newspaper classified ads" in 115 U.S. markets. A 2009 Pew Research Center study found 2000-08, newspapers lost almost half their classified ad sales to Craigslist and similar sites.

Based in Phoenix, Ariz., the New Times chain of alt-weeklies started in 1970, with the founding of what became the Phoenix New Times as a response to the Vietnam War and the murders at Kent State. Under the leadership of executive editor Michael Lacey and publisher Jim Larkin, the company expanded to several other cities, eventually merging with New York's Village Voice and other papers to become Village Voice Media in 2005. The new company boasted 17 alt-weeklies coast-to-coast.

As with other outlets in the alternative press, New Times' papers were free, relying on advertising, especially classified advertising to earn money. To counter Craigslist's influence on a vital revenue stream, Lacey and Larkin in 2004 founded Backpage.com, which WIRED magazine described as "a bare-bones inter-face wrapped in Facebooky blue, similar to Craigslist in form and function."

The site's name was a nod to the classified ads in the back section of every New Times paper, "culminating in a premium-priced ad showcase on the paper's back page." The idea for Backpage.com came from New Times salesman Carl Ferrer; Larkin put him in charge of the new venture.

Backpage helped sustain first New Times', then Village Voice Media's papers, and expanded to become the second-largest online classifieds site next to Craigslist. Lacey and Larkin sold Village Voice Media to company executives in 2012. The pair sold Backpage to Ferrer in 2015.

Craigslist and Backpage had listings for a variety of goods and services, such as real estate, yard sales, personals, work wanted and jobs offered, and adult-themed advertising.

Reason Magazine wrote:

"Like Craigslist, Backpage was divided into categories for different types of posts, most of which had nothing to do with sex work. But the 'adult' wing of the site, sub-divided into sections for strippers, 'phones and websites,' 'dom and fetish,' 'male escorts,' 'escorts,' and more, garnered the most attention."

For Craigslist and Backpage, their adult sections would prove to be public relations nightmares, with state attorneys general and activists condemning them as havens for ads for prostitution and more. Reporters and academics noted similar adult advertising is a staple of alt-weeklies for many years, and could be found in other print outlets, such as the Yellow Pages and even some dailies.

Escort 'Erotic Services' 
By 2006, Craigslist's nearly-all-free business model dominated the classified ad market. For years, adult listings under Craigslist's "erotic services" section were free. That changed as the company faced calls from state attorneys general and other groups to restrict or do away with all adult ads on the site.

Craigslist's critics often conflated consensual adult prostitution with the far more serious crimes of coerced adult prostitution and child prostitution. The latter two are regarded as forms of "sex trafficking" under federal law, though sex trafficking involving children is sometimes called "child sex trafficking."

For example, in 2007, Atlanta's mayor slammed Craigslist for allowing itself to be used "as a means of promoting and enabling child prostitution," asking the site remove all ads for sexual services, not just those suspected of involving child sex trafficking.

In March 2008, Connecticut's then-Attorney General Richard Blumenthal sent a letter to Craigslist demanding that the site remove its adult ads, which the AG alleged were promoting prostitution. Blumenthal threatened possible legal action, stating that a "Connecticut woman" had recently been arrested for prostitution after advertising sexual services on Craigslist. 

Techdirt editor Mike Masnick observed that Craigslist was unfairly being blamed for posts by third parties, writing that Craigslist is "the tool provider, not the content provider," and that it was not liable for third-party content under Section 230 of the U.S. Communications Decency Act.

In November 2008, Craigslist entered into an agreement with Blumenthal and Attorneys General from 39 other states, agreeing to charge customers $5-$10 to post adult ads. Craigslist also agreed to require a working phone number, and that payments be made by credit card, making the ads traceable.

The National Center for Missing and Exploited Children (NCMEC), a government-funded nonprofit established as an information clearinghouse on missing and exploited kids, joined the Craigslist-Blumenthal agreement. NCMEC President Ernie Allen claimed that the sex traffickers of children "no longer parade them on the streets of America's cities," but now, "market them via the Internet."

Still, the pressure on Craigslist continued. In March 2009, Cook County, Illinois Sheriff Tom Dart sued Craigslist in federal court, claiming that Craigslist's erotic services section was a "public nuisance", referring to it as "the single largest source of prostitution in America".

In May 2009, South Carolina Attorney General Henry McMaster threatened Craigslist with a possible criminal investigation over the ads, and Illinois AG Lisa Madigan said that the "walls were closing in" for Craigslist, labeling it "an Internet brothel." Later that month, Craigslist announced that it was replacing its "erotic services" section with a new, heavily-monitored "adult" section.

Articles about Craigslist's transition to its new "adult" section often mentioned Philip Markoff, an alleged armed robber and murderer dubbed "the Craigslist killer" because police said he targeted his victims through the site's erotic services section. (Years later, in 2016, one industry watchdog claimed that ads posted to Craigslist by its users were linked to more than 100 murders.)

On October 20, 2009, Craigslist scored a legal win in Dart v. Craigslist, Inc., with federal Judge John F. Grady denying Dart's attempt to censor the site. Grady rejected the notion that the listings in Craigslist's adult category were obviously illegal, noting that a striptease artist advertising on the site was "not prostitution."

Craigslist had argued that it cooperated with law enforcement, including Dart, and that direct sex-for-money ads were banned by its terms of use. Craigslist further argued that it was shielded by Section 230.

Judge Grady agreed that Section 230 protected the site from liability, writing that, under the law, "Intermediaries are not culpable for 'aiding and abetting' their customers who misuse their services to commit unlawful acts."

Despite the ruling, Blumenthal continued his campaign against the classified ads giant, penning a letter to Craigslist joined by 17 other attorneys general. The AGs called on the site to rid itself of all adult ads, though the AGs recognized that Craigslist "may lose considerable revenue" as a result.

Masnick and other commentators defended Craigslist, observing that the site was making money off the ads because Blumenthal and other state AGs asked Craigslist to charge a fee for them.

In September 2010, Craigslist shut down its adult section, initially leaving only a notice that read "Censored" in place of the adult listings. It later took down the "Censored" notice, and confirmed the demise of the section. The New York Times observed that "advocacy groups and attorneys general" went after Craigslist in part because the site was "widely known," but the coalition would now set their sights on other targets.

One year later, in an interview with The Guardian, Craigslist CEO Jim Buckmaster admitted that the decision to nix the ads troubled him.

"For a long time we tried to do what, in our minds, was the principled thing. We ended up doing the pragmatic thing," he said.

Backpage and Adult Advertising 
After Craigslist ended the adult section, some adult listings almost immediately migrated to the site's "personals" section. They scattered to other sites as well, but Backpage, already number two in the classified ads market, benefitted the most. Many of the same controversies regarding content moderation and adult advertising that plagued Craigslist would affect Backpage as well.

In an internal email after Craigslist's takedown of its adult category, CEO Ferrer acknowledged the coming challenge.

"It is an opportunity for us. Also a time when we need to make sure our content is not illegal," he wrote.

In September 2010, a Missouri girl sued Village Voice Media, claiming that she'd been trafficked at age 14 via ads placed on the site, and that Backpage had been negligent. A federal judge dismissed the lawsuit, based on Section 230 of the Communications Decency Act.

A month after the suit was filed, Backpage hired former federal prosecutor and NCMEC board member Hemanshu Nigam to come up with a strategic plan to combat the misuse of the site for trafficking. Nigam and Backpage consulted with anti-trafficking organizations about measures to take, such as preventing the use of suggestive terms such as "Lolita," "incest" and "new in town." According to WIRED, Backpage had implemented most of these new protocols by January 2011.
VVM's news coverage cast a skeptical eye on the issue of sex trafficking, accusing the media and anti-trafficking organizations of wrongly conflating sex trafficking with consensual sex work, sometimes referred to as prostitution. In a series of investigative pieces beginning in early 2011, VVM criticized and debunked many misleading statistics and assertions regarding sex trafficking. In a March 23, 2011 piece, reporter Nick Pinto questioned the methodology of a study by the Women's Funding Network claiming that the number of girls being trafficked had risen "exponentially" in three states, calling it "junk science."

Similarly, the series, which ran in several VVM papers, debunked the much-criticized urban legend that the Super Bowl brings with it a spike in sex trafficking to the game's host city.

And the series looked into the often repeated claim that 100,000 to 300,000 children were "at risk" of commercial sexual exploitation in the U.S. VVM's reporters found the figure to be based on the faulty assumptions a flawed study, which one expert saying the study "has no scientific credibility to it." That factoid would go on to be debunked by several other outlets, including The Washington Post.

In April 2011, Hollywood celebrity couple Demi Moore and Ashton Kutcher's "Demi and Ashton Foundation" launched a media campaign titled, "Real Men Don't Buy Girls," featuring videos with celebrities such as Sean Penn, Justin Timberlake, and Kutcher himself, among others. Moore and Kutcher promoted the campaign on CNN's Piers Morgan Tonight, repeating the flawed 100,000 to 300,000 statistic and seemingly conflating prostitution with sex trafficking.

VVM took on the campaign and the flawed statistic in a cover story entitled, "Real Men Get Their Facts Straight," criticizing the videos' "frat boy humor" and exposing the issues with the underlying 100,000 to 300,000 statistic. Kutcher responded with a late night tweet storm, blasting VVM, writing that, "news outlets that who have financial interest in trafficking may have interest in applying bias to facts to secure their revenue." VVM replied with tweets stating that "mythical sex slave numbers matter: activists use them to target legal adult freedoms."

Outrage directed at VVM was building. In October 2011, in a full page ad in The New York Times, 36 clergymen demanded that VVM and Backpage remove the latter's adult classifieds section, citing reports of adult ads connected to underage prostitution, stating, "Even if one minor is sold for sex, it is one too many."

In a response to the ad, VVM asserted that it had "extensive working relationships with law enforcement from FBI to the local police", and claiming it had "spent millions of dollars and dedicated countless resources to protecting children from those who would misuse an adult site".

According to both Reason and WIRED, the cooperation between law enforcement and Backpage was genuine, with Backpage receiving praise from various police agencies for its help in finding trafficked persons and convicting their exploiters. In May 2011, the FBI awarded a certificate of recognition to Ferrer, then VP of Backpage, "for your outstanding cooperation and assistance in connection with an investigation of great importance."

In November 2011, the Coalition Against Trafficking in Women organized a demonstration outside of The Village Voices offices in New York City, with 50 persons chanting slogans and waving signs in protest against "Backpage.com's facilitation of sex trafficking."

Backpage and Village Voice split 
Increasingly, Backpage critics and law enforcement accused Backpage of being a hub for sex trafficking of both adults and minors despite claims by the website that it sought to block ads suspected of child sex trafficking or prostitution[11] and reported hundreds per month to the NCMEC, which in turn notified law enforcement.[12][13]

Backpage supporters claimed that by providing prompt and detailed information about suspicious postings to law enforcement, including phone numbers, credit card numbers and IP addresses, the website helped protect minors from trafficking. They contended that shutting down Backpage would drive traffickers to other places on the internet that would be less forthcoming about crucial information for law enforcement.

Numerous writers, non-governmental organizations (NGOs) legal experts and law enforcement officials including the Electronic Frontier Foundation, the Internet Archive, and the Cato Institute, argued that freedom of speech and potentially the internet itself would be threatened if adult-themed ads were prohibited on Backpage. These groups cited both the First Amendment as well as Section 230 of the Communications Decency Act, which holds that service providers were not liable for content produced by third parties.

In 2012, at the behest of a number of NGO's including Fair Girls and NCMEC, Fitzgibbon Media (at the time, a well-known progressive/liberal public relations agency) created a multimedia campaign to garner support for the anti-Backpage position. They enlisted support from musicians, politicians, journalists, media companies and retailers. 

(In 2015, Fitzgibbon Media closed its doors after its founder, Trevor Fitzgibbon, was accused of sexual harassment and assault by female employees of the company. Prosecutors declined to press charges. Fitzgibbon apologized, saying he was "sincerely sorry for my behavior and for any women who were harmed".)

The Fitzgibbon campaign created a greater public dialogue, both pro and con, regarding Backpage. Some companies including H&M, IKEA, and Barnes & Noble canceled ads for publications owned by Village Voice Media. Over 230,000 people including 600 religious leaders, 51 attorneys general, 19 U.S. senators, over 50 non-governmental associations, musician Alicia Keys, and members of R.E.M., The Roots, and Alabama Shakes petitioned the website to remove sexual content.

New York Times columnist Nicholas Kristof authored a number of columns criticizing Backpage, to which Backpage publicly responded. In a March 17, 2012 column, "Where Pimps Peddle Their Goods," Kristof told the story of a young woman whose "street name" was Alissa. Kristof wrote that pimps had coerced Alissa into a life of prostitution and posted ads for her on Backpage while she was underage. He also urged mainstream advertisers to boycott Village Voice Media and linked to a Change.org petition asking VVM to stop allowing its users to post adult ads on Backpage.

In response to the article, the Village Voice criticized Kristof's reporting, noting that Backpage had not existed in the cities where Alissa had been prostituted at the time she was underage. The unsigned Voice article also contended that Backpage dedicated "hundreds of staff to screen adult classifieds in order to keep juveniles off the site and to work proactively with law enforcement in their efforts to locate victims".

In 2012, Village Voice Media separated its newspaper company, which then consisted of 13 weekly alternative newspapers and their affiliated web properties, from Backpage, leaving Backpage in control of shareholders Mike Lacey and Jim Larkin.

In interviews with Phoenix media, Lacey explained that the controversies over Backpage had become "a distraction" for the editors of VVM's papers and that Backpage had come to monopolize his and Larkin's time.

Executives for the spinoff holding company, called Voice Media Group (VMG) and based in Denver, raised "some money from private investors" in order to purchase the newspapers; the executives who formed the new company were lower-ranked than Lacey and Larkin. In December 2014, Village Voice Media sold Backpage to a Dutch holding company. Carl Ferrer, the founder of Backpage, remained as CEO of the company. Michael Hardy of the Texas Observer stated that since Lacey and Larkin remained at Backpage, "it would be more accurate to say that Backpage spun off Village Voice Media."

Legal decisions 
Beginning in 2011 a number of legal challenges were brought in attempts to eliminate the adult section of Backpage or shut down the website entirely. Backpage successfully argued that the First Amendment protections of free speech would be compromised by any restriction on postings by individuals on the Backpage website.

Section 230 of the Communications Decency Act of 1996 (CDA) served as an additional cornerstone in the defense. Section 230 says that "No provider or user of an interactive computer service shall be treated as the publisher or speaker of any information provided by another information content provider." This portion of the CDA was drafted to protect ISPs and other interactive service providers on the Internet from liability for content originating from third parties. The enactment of this portion of the CDA overturned the decision in Stratton Oakmont, Inc. v. Prodigy Services Co. in which Prodigy was deemed by the court to be a publisher and therefore liable for content posted on its site. Many observers have credited the passage of section 230 of the CDA as the spark that ignited the explosive growth of the internet. The protection afforded to website owners under section 230 was upheld in numerous court cases subsequent to the passage of the legislation in 1996 including Doe v. MySpace Inc., 528 F.3d 413 (5th Cir. 2008) and Dart v. Craigslist, Inc., 665 F. Supp. 2d 961 (N.D. Ill. October 20, 2009).

Some of the most important civil cases involving Backpage are described below.

M.A., et al. vs. Village Voice Media Holdings, LLC

Plaintiff M.A., a 14-year-old runaway, was a victim of sex trafficking by one Latasha Jewell McFarland, who later pleaded guilty to taking nude photos of M.A. and posting them to Backpage in ads offering M.A. for commercial sex. M.A. sued Backpage, arguing Backpage was liable because Backpage had created an "adult" category on the site and was aware that other minors had been trafficked through ads in that category. In 2011, the court ruled that CDA Section 230 still applied and "even if Backpage knows that third parties are posting illegal content, 'the service providers' failure to intervene is immunized'".

Backpage.com, LLC vs. McKenna

In 2012, Washington state passed SB 6251, which made it a felony to either directly or indirectly publish or cause to be published "any advertisement for a commercial sex act…that includes the depiction of a minor". Ignorance of the age of the minor depicted in the ad was no defense. Backpage, joined by the Internet Archive, sued in federal court to stop the law from going into effect. The court barred enforcement, finding the statute precluded by federal law, specifically, CDA Section 230. It also ruled that SB 6251 likely violated the First Amendment, as the state could not assume that all ads in an "adult" section were for prostitution without trampling free speech rights.

Backpage.com v. Cooper

Here, a federal judge enjoined a Tennessee law passed in 2012, SB 2371, which was a broader version of the Washington state statute. SB 2371 made it a felony to "sell or offer to sell" an ad that "would appear to a reasonable person" to be for a commercial sex act with a minor. As in McKenna, the court found that the law was both precluded by CDA 230 and likely in violation of the First Amendment and the Commerce Clause of the U.S. Constitution. The court also ruled that the law's definition of "commercial sex act" was so broad as to potentially include legal adult services, such as phone sex. "[W]hen freedom of speech hangs in the balance – the state may not use a butcher knife on a problem that requires a scalpel to fix," the court noted.

Backpage v. Hoffman

This August 2013 ruling was the third strike against state laws attempting to legislate Backpage out of existence. In this case, New Jersey enacted a statute, referred to by the court as 12(b)1, which largely echoed the language of the Washington state and Tennessee laws. Again, a federal judge enjoined the law, finding it preempted by CDA Section 230, and in violation of the First Amendment and the Commerce Clause. The act is "hopelessly vague and overbroad" and "impermissibly chills protected speech," the judge wrote, ridiculing NJ's Attorney General for ignoring the statute's plain language in his defense of it. The Internet Archive also joined in this suit.

Backpage v. Dart

Following his loss in Dart v. Craigslist, Cook County, Illinois Sheriff Tom Dart turned his attention to Backpage, and more specifically, two of Backpage's payment processors, MasterCard and Visa. In June 2015, Dart wrote a letter to both companies, requesting that they "cease and desist" allowing their cards to purchase any ads on Backpage, even non-adult ones, suggesting that they could be in violation of federal law due to human trafficking via ads on the site. MC and Visa complied. Backpage then sued Dart in federal court, arguing he had used the power of his office to violate Backpage's First Amendment rights. The district court ruled in Dart's favor, but in November 2015, a three-judge panel of the Seventh Circuit Court of Appeals reversed the district court in an opinion written by Judge Richard Posner.

Posner noted that Dart would only be in the right if there had been "no constitutional protected speech in the ads on Backpage's website". As a result, Posner found Dart's letter to be a First Amendment violation. Posner pointed out that Dart's claim that "everything in the adult section of Backpage's website is criminal, violent, or exploitive," was inaccurate.

Posner wrote:

"Fetishism? Phone sex? Performances by striptease artists? (Vulgar is not violent.) One ad in the category ‘dom & fetish' is for the services of a ‘professional dominatrix'—a woman who is paid to whip or otherwise humiliate a customer in order to arouse him sexually . . . It's not obvious that such conduct endangers women or children or violates any laws, including laws against prostitution."

Posner ordered the lower court to enjoin Dart from taking any actions against payment processors for Backpage. Backpage's win was pyrrhic, however. MC and Visa continued to disallow the use of its cards on the site.

Jane Doe, et al. v. Backpage.com

Three anonymous Jane Does who were sex trafficked as minors sued Backpage in 2014 in federal court, arguing that their traffickers used Backpage to post ads selling them for sex. They were raped numerous times while underage and accuse Backpage of facilitating sex trafficking due to its business and editorial practices, as well as the design of the website itself. The district court ruled against the plaintiffs, who then appealed to the First Circuit Court of Appeals. In an opinion written by Judge Bruce M. Seyla, the appeals court ruled that the actions by Backpage were "traditional publisher functions" regarding third-party content, and therefore were shielded by CDA Section 230. Stearns conceded that the Does' suffering evoked "outrage," but that the "remedy is through legislation not litigation". The appellants sought certiorari by the U.S. Supreme Court and were denied. The case became the basis for the 2017 documentary, I Am Jane Doe.

In June 2017, the three Jane Does re-filed their complaint in federal court using information taken from the U.S. Senate's investigation into Backpage, which concluded Backpage had facilitated sex trafficking. The complaint alleged that Backpage substantially changed the ads connected to the three Jane Does, thereby losing its Section 230 protection. The court agreed that in the case of one ad involving Jane Doe 3, an edit occurred suggesting that she was an adult. Backpage counsel argued that the ad's poster actually made the change, but the court said this was a fact to be determined at trial and allowed Jane Doe 3's case to continue. In the case of Jane Does 1 and 2, the court said there was no evidence that Backpage substantially contributed to the ads, so Backpage would have Section 230 immunity against those claims. In August 2018, the court stayed proceedings in the case pending the conclusion of the criminal case in Arizona.

Backpage.com v. Lynch

In 2015, Congress passed the Stop Advertising Victims of Exploitation Act (SAVE ACT), a vaguely worded law that forbade advertising that involved underage or coerced prostitution, i.e., sex trafficking. The law supposedly took aim at adult ads on Backpage, but civil liberties groups argued that the law was too broad and would have a chilling effect on speech. Backpage sued then-U.S. Attorney General Loretta Lynch to preclude the law's enforcement, arguing that despite its best efforts to keep illegal ads off its site, the wording of the law raised the bar for prosecution from a "knowing" standard to one of "reckless disregard," and therefore violated the First Amendment.

In October 2016, the U.S. District Court for the District of Columbia found that the law did not criminalize protected speech, and that because Backpage took steps to avoid having illegal content on its site, it arguably was not in imminent danger of prosecution. But Backpage's suit won a significant clarification from the court, which interpreted the law as requiring a "knowing" mens rea standard for a conviction, which is a higher standard than "reckless disregard". Wrote the court: "...while it might be true that some Congressional members had Backpage.com in mind when enacting the SAVE ACT, the statute is 'aimed' at individuals who knowingly advertise or benefit from advertising sex trafficking."

California prosecution
On October 6, 2016, Texas Attorney General Ken Paxton and California Attorney General Kamala Harris announced that Texas authorities had raided the Dallas headquarters of Backpage.com and arrested CEO Carl Ferrer at the George Bush Intercontinental Airport in Houston on felony charges of pimping, pimping a minor, and conspiracy to commit pimping. In a press release, Harris denounced Backpage as "the world's largest online brothel". The California arrest warrant alleged that 99% of Backpage's revenue was directly attributable to prostitution-related ads and that many of the ads involved victims of sex trafficking, including children under the age of 18. The State of Texas was also considering a money laundering charge pending its investigation.  Arrest warrants were issued against former Backpage owners and founders Michael Lacey and James Larkin. Lacey and Larkin were charged with conspiracy to commit pimping.

Backpage general counsel Liz McDougall dismissed the raid as an "election year stunt", which wasn't "a good-faith action by law enforcement". McDougall said that the company would "take all steps necessary to end this frivolous prosecution and will pursue its full remedies under federal law against the state actors who chose to ignore the law, as it has done successfully in other cases." Backpage accused California attorney general Kamala Harris, who was running for the U.S. Senate at the time, of an illegal prosecution.

Harris's  office fought against releasing the men on bail, and the three prisoners appeared together in court, confined to a cage inside a Sacramento courtroom, wearing orange jumpsuits. They were released on October 13, 2016, with bail set at $500,000 for Ferrer, and $250,000 each for Lacey and Larkin. All three pleaded not guilty.

Writing for the magazine Pacific Standard, reporter Melissa Gira Grant observed that news outlets repeatedly referred to the three men as being charged with "sex trafficking," though the charges were actually related to prostitution.

"None are accused with forcing anyone into prostitution," she wrote. "None are even accused of having had any physical contact with anyone in the sex trade. What the complaint claims the men did was earn money from a website where users could place advertisements for what Backpage categorized as 'adult' services."

On October 17, 2016, attorneys for Ferrer, Larkin and Lacey sent a letter to Harris asking that all charges against their clients be dropped. Harris refused. The letter accused Harris of acting in bad faith, since she had signed a letter to Congress in 2013, along with 48 other state attorneys general, telling Congress that Section 230 of the CDA "prevents State and local law enforcement agencies from prosecuting" companies such as Backpage, and asking that Congress change the law.

On November 17, 2016, Superior Court Judge Michael Bowman issued a tentative ruling on a motion to dismiss the charges, indicating that he would likely do so. He ruled that the many of Backpage's decisions regarding third-party content were "all traditional publishing decisions", which are "generally immunized under" Section 230. He wrote, "In short, any victimization resulted from the third party's placement of the ad, not because Backpage [profited] from the ad placement."

On December 9, 2016, Bowman issued his final ruling, dismissing all the charges in the complaint, stating that: "...Congress has precluded liability for online publishers for the action of publishing third party speech and thus provided for both a foreclosure from prosecution and an affirmative defense at trial. Congress has spoken on this matter and it is for Congress, not this Court, to revisit."

On December 23, 2016, the state of California filed new charges against Backpage CEO Carl Ferrer and former Backpage owners Mike Lacey and Jim Larkin accusing them of pimping and money laundering. Lawyers for Backpage responded that the new charges rehashed the earlier case, which had been dismissed. The filing of new charges came just a few weeks before Harris was to be sworn in as U.S. Senator from California.

Superior Court Judge Lawrence Brown dismissed the new pimping charges on August 23, 2017, writing that the state's "attempt to assign criminal liability to defendants who offered an online forum on which other people posted advertisements that led to prostitution . . . confuse moral obligations with legal ones and have been rejected in other jurisdictions".

Brown allowed most of the money-laundering counts to stand. The state alleges that Backpage illegally set up separate accounts to accept payments for ads from credit card companies that refused to do business with them after Sheriff Dart threatened them. Brown warned that prosecutors would be obliged to "show that the profits came solely from that underlying criminal activity."

As part of his plea deal with the federal government, Ferrer pled guilty to one conspiracy count and three counts of money-laundering in California state court, as well as to charges in Texas and in federal court. The California case against Lacey and Larkin for money laundering remains on hold pending the outcome of the federal trial. Ferrer has promised to testify against Lacey and Larkin in return for leniency.

U.S. Senate investigation 
Since April 2015, the U.S. Senate Permanent Subcommittee on Investigations ("PSI") had been investigating Backpage.com as part of an overall investigation of human trafficking.  After a voluntary, day-long briefing and interview provided by the company's General Counsel, PSI followed up with a subpoena to Backpage.com demanding over 40 categories of documents, covering 120 subjects, regarding Backpage's business practices. Much of the subpoena targeted Backpage's editorial functions as an online intermediary.

Over the ensuing months, Backpage raised and PSI rejected numerous objections to the subpoena, including that the subpoena was impermissibly burdensome both in the volume of documents PSI demanded and in its intrusion into constitutionally-protected editorial discretion. PSI subsequently issued a shorter document subpoena with only eight requests but broader in scope and also targeting Backpage.com's editorial functions. Backpage.com continued to object on First Amendment and other grounds.

PSI applied in March 2016 for a federal court order to enforce three of the eight categories of documents in the subpoena. In August 2016, the U.S. District Court in D.C. granted PSI's application and ordered Backpage to produce documents responsive to the three requests.

Backpage immediately filed an appeal and sought a stay, which the district court denied, then filed emergency stay petitions with the U.S. Court of Appeals for the D.C. Circuit, and the U.S. Supreme Court. Each appellate court issued temporary stays to consider whether to grant a stay pending appeal,  but eventually denied the emergency stay requests.  However, the D.C. Circuit agreed to expedite the appeal, and one of its judges who considered the emergency stay said he would have granted it. Backpage has continued to pursue its appeal despite producing thousands of documents to PSI pursuant to the District Court order. PSI scheduled a Subcommittee hearing regarding Backpage.com for January 10, 2017.

On January 9, 2017, prior to its scheduled hearings on Backpage the next day, the PSI released a report, denouncing what it referred to as Backpage's "knowing facilitation of online sex trafficking".

That same day, Backpage removed its adult category from all of its sites in the United States. In its place, the site posted a banner that read, "CENSORED," stating that "the government has unconstitutionally censored this content".  Backpage said it took the action due to the government's harassment and extra-legal tactics, which made it too costly for Backpage to continue hosting adult ads.

Subcommittee chair Sen. Rob Portman, a Republican, and ranking Democrat Sen. Claire McCaskill, issued statement denying that Backpage's move was in response to censorship, saying the site's shutdown of its adult ad section was a "validation of our findings".

The Electronic Frontier Foundation weighed in, stating that the site was succumbing to "years of government pressure"; as a result, both the First Amendment and CDA Section 230 were imperiled. Lois Lee, founder of the anti-trafficking organization, Children of the Night, bemoaned the loss of Backpage as an investigative tool, saying that child prostitution "existed long before Backpage or the Internet" and that Backpage is "not the cause or even a cause". Rather, the site "was an opportunity to better attack the problem".

NCMEC applauded the takedown in a statement, saying it was "gratified to know that as a result of the recent decision, a child is now less likely to be sold for sex on Backpage".

Lacey and Larkin sold the site to Ferrer in 2015. The PSI subpoenaed all three, along with two current Backpage execs, to be present at the Jan. 10 hearing. In response to attempted questioning from senators on the subcommittee, each witness declined to answer, "based on the rights provided by the Fifth and First Amendments" to the Constitution.

Portman claimed that the subcommittee's investigators discovered that Backpage had created a "filter" to delete "hundreds of words indicative of sex trafficking or prostitution before publication"—words such as "Lolita," "teen," "young" and so forth, ostensibly to hide questionable ads from law enforcement.

Techdirt editor Mike Masnick later wrote that such moderation was actually encouraged by Section 230's safe harbor, stating that one could "quite clearly see this as Backpage letting users know that it is not a place that should be used for sex trafficking, because it clearly alerts them to things that they don't want on the site." Masnick also noted that the same day as the hearing, Backpage had won another legal battle when the Supreme Court refused to hear an appeal of a lower court's dismissal of Jane Doe, et al. v. Backpage.com.

In a piece on the hearing, Elizabeth Nolan Brown, a senior editor at Reason magazine, wrote that the terms in question did not necessarily indicate sex trafficking, since, for example, "teen" could apply to 18 and 19-year-olds, who were "both 'teens' and, legally, adults".  She also quotes NCMEC as stating that "It is virtually impossible to determine how old the young women in these ads are without an in-depth criminal investigation".

But Portman, McCaskill and others saw these moderation practices as nefarious. In his concluding remarks, Portman stated that Backpage deliberately sanitized [these ads] to conceal evidence of prostitution, to conceal evidence of child trafficking", and as a result had "broken the law". Portman said that he and McCaskill would promptly consider whether to refer this matter to the Department of Justice (DOJ)  . . . for further investigation."

By April 2017, the Arizona Republic was reporting that a federal grand jury had been impaneled in Phoenix and was considering possible indictments of Lacey and Larkin.

Federal prosecution 
In late March 2018 and early April 2018, courts in Massachusetts and Florida ruled that Backpage's moderation practices may have fallen outside the immunity from civil suits granted by Section 230. The latter ruling argued that because Backpage "materially contributed to the content of the advertisement" by censoring specific keywords, it became a publisher of content and thus no longer protected.

Backpage's adult services sections became the subject of an investigation by the Federal Bureau of Investigation, the United States Postal Inspection Service, the United States Department of Justice, the Internal Revenue Service Criminal Investigator Division, with analytical assistance from the Joint Regional Intelligence Center over accusations that the website knowingly allowed and encouraged users to post ads related to prostitution and human trafficking, particularly involving minors, and took steps to intentionally obfuscate these activities.

On April 6, 2018, Backpage was seized by the FBI and other federal agencies, and Michael Lacey's home was raided by authorities. Lacey was arrested at gunpoint that day at his home in Paradise Valley; Larkin was arrested at an airport in Phoenix before exiting the plane, having returned from a trip overseas. Lacey was charged with money laundering and violations of the Travel Act.

On April 9, 2018, the US Department of Justice's indictment against Backpage was unsealed. The 93 counts included "conspiracy to facilitate prostitution using a facility in interstate or foreign commerce, facilitating prostitution using a facility in interstate or foreign commerce, conspiracy to commit money laundering, concealment money laundering, international promotional money laundering, and transactional money laundering." According to prosecutors, the seven people charged in the indictment are: Michael Lacey of Paradise Valley, Arizona; James Larkin of Paradise Valley, Arizona; Scott Spear of Scottsdale, Arizona; John E. "Jed" Brunst of Phoenix, Arizona; Daniel Hyer of Dallas, Texas; Andrew Padilla of Plano, Texas; and Jaala Joye Vaught of Addison, Texas.

Its CEO, Carl Ferrer, pleaded guilty to charges of facilitating prostitution and money laundering, acknowledging that "the great majority" of the adult advertisements on Backpage were actually advertisements for prostitution. As part of his plea agreement Ferrer agreed to shut down the site and give its data to law enforcement. He agreed to testify against other alleged co-conspirators, such as but not limited to founders Michael Lacey and James Larkin. Backpage also pleaded guilty to human trafficking.

In July 2018, the grand jury in Phoenix issued a superseding indictment, increasing the total number of charges to 100, though the nature of the charges remained the same. The new indictment focused on 50 distinct adult ads culled from the millions of adult and non-adult ads that ran on the site daily, and the indictment used the fact that Backpage had worked with law enforcement to show that Backpage's executives were aware of illegal content on the site.

In August 2018, Backpage sales Dan Hyer pleaded guilty to conspiracy to facilitate prostitution, all other charges against him were dropped; the remaining six defendants pled not guilty to all charges.

The jury trial began in federal court in Phoenix, Arizona on September 1, 2021. In his opening statement, federal prosecutor Reginald Jones claimed that the site's owners and operators were aware that Backpage was being used for illegal activity, specifically prostitution, "but they didn't shut down the website." Defense attorneys countered that the adult services ads posted to Backpage were controversial, but still protected by the First Amendment.

Prosecutors called four witnesses during the eight days of trial: Special Agent Brian Fichtner of the California Office of the Attorney General; Sharon Cooper, a physician who works with trafficking victims; Jessika Svendgard; and Svendgard's mother Nacole Svendgard.

According to The Arizona Republic, Jessika Svendgard testified that she had been lured into a 105-day stint as a prostitute at age 15, where she would be "raped for money." She said both she and her trafficker advertised on Backpage, indicating falsely that she was 18 at the time. Under cross-examination, she indicated that she had never "met, spoken to, or communicated in writing" with any of the six defendants. Her struggle in suing Backpage and obtaining a settlement in Washington state was depicted in the 2017 anti-Backpage documentary, "I Am Jane Doe."

Special Agent Brian Fichtner testified about his investigation into Backpage on behalf of the California Attorney General's Office under then-Attorney General Kamala Harris, which led to the arrests on pimping charges of Lacey, Larkin and Ferrer in 2016. (Though the pimping charges were twice dismissed, state money laundering charges against the defendants survived.) According to Reason magazine, the prosecution called Fichtner "to present Backpage ads that he and federal prosecutors deemed to be clear evidence of illegal sex work," but Fichtner conceded that "none of the ads alone would be enough to justify a prostitution arrest."

Sharon Cooper described her work with sex trafficking victims and "casually mentioned child victims" of sex trafficking "throughout her testimony," as reported by The Arizona Republic.

On September 14, 2021, federal Judge Susan Brnovich declared a mistrial in the case, saying that prosecution had abused the leeway she had given it by making constant references to child sex trafficking rather than focusing on the crimes the defendants are charged with: facilitating prostitution.

"The government, as prosecutors, are held to a higher standard," Brnovich said. "Their goal is not to win at any costs, but their goal is to win by the rules."

The trial had been expected to last two to three months. Brnovich granted the defense motion for mistrial on day eight.

Brnovich then set an October 5 status hearing in the case.

At the October 5 hearing, Brnovich scheduled a new trial for February 22, 2022.

Brnovich recused herself for unknown reasons on October 29, 2021, and federal Judge Diane Humetewa was chosen by lot to replace her. (Humetewa is the fourth judge to be assigned the case so far.) A new trial has been delayed as the defense appeals Humetewa's denial of a motion to dismiss the case for good.

On September 2, 2022, a three-judge panel of the Ninth Circuit Court of Appeals heard oral arguments in the defense's appeal of Humetewa's ruling. Defendants argued that the case should be dismissed because a new trial would violate the Fifth Amendment's prohibition on Double Jeopardy. Though the defendants had moved for the mistrial, their attorneys argued that the prosecution "goaded" them into doing so by engaging in intentional misconduct; specifically, by focusing too much on the subject of child-sex trafficking.

On September 21, 2022, the appeals panel ruled against the defendants, upholding Humetewa's ruling and finding that the prosecution "had no reason to sabotage its own trial." The decision reportedly made it likely that Lacey, Larkin, et al. would face a retrial sometimes in 2023.

Backpage was launched in 2004 by New Times Media (later to be known as Village Voice Media), a publisher of 11 alternative newsweeklies, as a free classified advertising website.

The site included the various categories found in newspaper classified sections including those that were unique to and part of the First Amendment-driven traditions of most alternative weeklies. These included personals (including adult-oriented personal ads), adult services, musicians and "New Age" services.

Until January 9, 2017, Backpage contained an adult section containing different subcategories of various sex work. The company suspended its adult listings following accusations by a United States Senate subcommittee of being directly involved with sex-trafficking and the sexual exploitation of minors. However, many escorts and erotic masseuses admit to moving their ads to the "massage" and "women seeking men" listings. Prostitution is illegal throughout the United States, except for some counties in Nevada.

Kristen DiAngelo, executive director of the Sex Workers Outreach Project of Sacramento, criticized the shutdown, asking how many sex workers across the United States no longer had a way to support themselves. Backpage allowed for sex workers using the site to post bad date lists, screen clients, and communicate with other sex workers to ensure a safer experience. Activists argued that the move would force some of the site's users to work on the street.

In 2015 Backpage lost all credit card processing agreements as banks came under pressure from law enforcement, leaving Bitcoin as the remaining option for paid ads.

Subsequent history 
SESTA/FOSTA was passed into law in 2018, making it illegal to promote or facilitate prostitution. The new law also created an exception to CDA Section 230, removing an interactive computer service's immunity from civil and criminal state laws regarding sex trafficking. The law's proponents claimed that it was needed to crackdown on Backpage, which they accused of facilitating sex trafficking through its adult section. Yet, the defendants in the Backpage case were not charged under SESTA/FOSTA, but under the U.S. Travel Act and money laundering statutes. Their arrests were on April 6, 2018. Trump signed SESTA/FOSTA into law on April 11, 2018.

DOJ Memos 
U.S. Department of Justice memos from 2012 and 2013, obtained by Reason and published in August 2019, revealed that Backpage actively fought against child prostitution on the website. Reason reports that federal prosecutors accidentally sent the memos to defense lawyers in the Backpage case sometime in 2018 as part of discovery, but the memos were placed under seal and cannot be used at trial.

Attorneys at the U.S. Attorney's Office for the Western District of Washington wrote both memos, assessing the possibilities of a successful prosecution of Backpage. The 2012 memo paraphrased an FBI agent with the Innocence Lost Task Force stating that "unlike virtually every other website that is used for prostitution and sex trafficking, Backpage is remarkably responsive to law enforcement requests and often takes proactive steps to assist in investigations".

According to the 2012 memo, Backpage employees testified in criminal cases, answered subpoenas within 24 hours (sometimes within the hour), and sometimes gave law enforcement information without a subpoena in "exigent circumstances", such as a missing child. Law enforcement was able to "contact Backpage and obtain immediate removal of certain posts" suspected of involving juveniles. Backpage's age-verification protocol was imperfect but standard in the industry. And Backpage reported ads suspected of involving child sex trafficking to the National Center for Missing and Exploited Children (NCMEC). The memo concludes that "any prosecution of Backpage would likely have to overcome Backpage's efforts to actively cooperate with law enforcement".

The 2013 memo was also skeptical of a successful prosecution, stating, "[W]e have yet to uncover compelling evidence of criminal intent or a pattern of reckless conduct regarding minors." It described how Backpage's moderation changed over time, and paraphrased NCMEC's then-president and CEO, Ernie Allen as saying he believed Backpage wanted child sex trafficking off its site, but that "the use of the Internet to market commercial sex was so fluid that any system of moderation and reporting was destined to fail". The memo suggests that the government may want to consider going after Backpage using money laundering statutes.

Hacking/Hustling survey 
Published in January 2020, a survey of sex workers by the sex-worker-rights group Hacking/Hustling indicated that sex workers suffered in the wake of SESTA/FOSTA's passage and the federal government's seizure of Backpage. According to The Daily Beast, the survey found that "33.8 percent of respondents reported an increase in violence from clients after the law was signed, and 72.5 percent reported they were facing increased financial insecurity", and sex-worker rights advocates "related stories of sex workers who were thrust into the arms of pimps in order to find work, or back into abusive relationships for want of somewhere to stay."

GAO report 
In June 2021, the U.S. Governmental Accountability Office (GAO) released a report, stating that SESTA/FOSTA had only been used once by the DOJ since it was passed in 2018. Both SESTA/FOSTA and the takedown of Backpage using other statutes had caused the adult online ad market to fragment and scatter to sites hosted in other countries.

The GAO report concludes that the seizure of Backpage has had an adverse effect on federal law enforcement's ability to investigate sex trafficking cases. It reads:

... gathering evidence to bring cases against users of online platforms has also become more difficult. According to a 2019 FBI document, the FBI's ability to identify and locate sex trafficking victims and perpetrators was significantly decreased following the takedown of backpage.com. According to FBI officials, this is largely because law enforcement was familiar with backpage.com, and backpage.com was generally responsive to legal requests for information. In contrast, officials said, law enforcement may be less familiar with platforms located overseas. Further, obtaining evidence from entities overseas may be more cumbersome and time-intensive, as those who control such platforms may not voluntarily respond to legal process, and mutual legal assistance requests may take months, if not years, according to DOJ officials. Despite these investigative challenges, DOJ officials said they are committed to holding accountable those who control online platforms that promote sex trafficking.

Alleged victims 
On April 9, 2018, the US Department of Justice's indictment against Backpage was unsealed. It contains details about 17 alleged victims who range from minors as young as 14 years old to adults, who were allegedly trafficked on the site while Backpage was knowingly facilitating prostitution. One 15-year-old is alleged to have been forced to do in-calls at hotels. A second teenager was allegedly told to "perform sexual acts at gunpoint and choked" until she had seizures, before being gang raped. A third victim, advertised under the pseudonym "Nadia", was stabbed to death, while a fourth victim was murdered in 2015, and her corpse deliberately burned.

The lawyer for Backpage operations manager Andrew Padilla stated that his client was "not legally responsible for any actions of third parties under U.S. law. He is no more responsible than the owner of a community billboard when someone places an ad on it".

In October 2018, a Texas woman sued Backpage and Facebook, claiming she had been sex trafficked on Backpage by a man who lured her into prostitution by posing as her friend on the social media network.

On April 15, 2019, a Wisconsin man was convicted on federal sex trafficking charges over victims who he brought across state lines, forced into prostitution and advertised on Backpage.

On April 29, 2019, a Florida former middle school teacher was sentenced to 10 years in federal prison for buying sex with a 14-year-old girl who was advertised on Backpage.

See also
 Craigslist
 I Am Jane Doe

References

External links
 

Internet properties disestablished in 2018
Internet properties established in 2004
Internet services shut down by a legal challenge
Money laundering
Online marketplaces of the United States
Prostitution in the United States
Domain name seizures by United States